Abies alba, the European silver fir or silver fir, is a fir native to the mountains of Europe, from the Pyrenees north to Normandy, east to the Alps and the Carpathians, Slovenia, Croatia, Bosnia and Herzegovina, Montenegro, Serbia, and south to Italy, Bulgaria, Kosovo, Albania and northern Greece; it is also commonly grown on Christmas tree plantations in the North East region of North America spanning New England in the US to the Maritime provinces of Canada.

Description

The leaf is usually slightly notched at the tip. The wood is white, leading to the species name alba.

When cultivated on Christmas Tree plantations, the tree naturally forms a symmetrical triangle shape. The trees are full and dense with smell of resin, and are known to be one of the longest lasting after being cut.   In the forest the evergreen tends to form stands with other firs and beeches. It is closely related to Bulgarian fir (Abies borisiiregis) further to the southeast in the Balkan Peninsula, Spanish fir (Abies pinsapo) of Spain and Morocco and Sicilian fir (Abies nebrodensis) in Sicily, differing from these and other related Euro-Mediterranean firs in the sparser foliage, with the leaves spread either side of the shoot, leaving the shoot readily visible from above. Some botanists treat Bulgarian fir and Sicilian fir as varieties of silver fir, as A. alba var. acutifolia and A. alba var. nebrodensis, respectively.

Ecology
Silver fir is an important component species in the dinaric calcareous block fir forest in the western Balkan Peninsula.

In Italy, the silver fir is an important component of the mixed broadleaved-coniferous forest of the Apennine Mountains, especially in northern Apennine. The fir prefer a cold and humid climate, in northern exposition, with a high rainfall (over 1500 mm per year). In the oriental Alps of Italy, silver firs grow in mixed forests with Norway spruce, beech, and other trees.

Its cone scales are eaten by the caterpillars of the tortrix moth Cydia illutana, while C. duplicana feeds on the bark around injuries or canker.

Chemistry and pharmacology

The bark and wood of silver fir are rich in antioxidative polyphenols. Six phenolic acids were identified (gallic, homovanillic, protocatechuic, p-hydroxybenzoic, vanillic and p-coumaric), three flavonoids (catechin, epicatechin and catechin tetramethyl ether) and eight lignans (taxiresinol, 7-(2-methyl-3,4-dihydroxytetrahydropyran-5-yloxy)-taxiresinol, secoisolariciresinol, lariciresinol, hydroxymatairesinol, isolariciresinol, matairesinol and pinoresinol).
The extract from the trunk was shown to prevent atherosclerosis in guinea pigs and to have cardioprotective effect in isolated rat hearts. Silver fir wood extract was found to reduce the post-prandial glycemic response (concentration of sugar in the blood after the meal) in healthy volunteers.

Uses
In Roman times the wood was used to make wooden casks to store and transport wine and other substances.

A resinous essential oil can be extracted. This pine-scented oil is used in perfumes, bath products, and aerosol inhalants. Its branches (including the leaves, bark and wood) were used for production of spruce beer.

Silver fir is the species first used as a Christmas tree, but has been largely replaced by Nordmann fir (which has denser, more attractive foliage), Norway spruce (which is much cheaper to grow), and other species.

The wood is strong, lightweight, light-colored, fine grained, even-textured and long fibered. The timber is mainly used as construction wood, furniture, plywood, pulpwood and paper manufacture.

The honeydew which is produced by aphids sitting on the silver fir is collected by honey bees. The resulting honey is marketed as "fir honey".

Etymology
Abies is derived from Latin, meaning 'rising one'. The name was used to refer to tall trees or ships.

Alba means 'bright' or 'dead white'.

References

External links

conifers.org: Abies alba
botany.cz: Abies alba Mill
photomazza.com: Abies alba
conifersaroundtheworld.com: Abies alba - European White Fir.
pfaf.org: Abies alba Mill.
monumentaltrees.com: The thickest, tallest, and oldest European silver fir trees (Abies alba)
baumkunde.de: Weiß-Tanne (Abies alba) | In German
Abies alba. Distribution map, genetic conservation units and related resources. European Forest Genetic Resources Programme (EUFORGEN)

alba
Trees of Europe
Flora of the Alps
Flora of Spain
Flora of the Pyrenees
Flora of France
Flora of the Carpathians
Plants described in 1768
Flora of Montenegro
Taxa named by Philip Miller